Muizon station (French: Gare de Muizon) is a railway station located in the French municipality of Muizon, in the département of Marne. It is served by TER Grand Est trains between Reims and Fismes (line C11) operated by the SNCF.

See also 
 List of SNCF stations

References

Railway stations in Marne (department)